Tel Hashomer camptodactyly syndrome is a rare genetic disorder which is characterized by camptodactyly,( a condition where one or more fingers or toes are permanently bent), facial dysmorphisms, and fingerprint, skeletal and muscular abnormalities.This disorder is thought to be inherited in an autosomal recessive fashion.

Presentation 
This disorder has symptoms that affect the feet, hands, muscles, fingerprints, skeleton, heart and back, these include: talipes equinovarus (clubfeet), thenar/hypothenar hypoplasia, abnormalities of the palmar crease and the fingerprints, hypertelorism, long philtrum, spina bifida, and mitral valve prolapse.

Etimology 

This disorder was discovered in the late 1960s-mid 1970s by Richard M Goodman. a US-born geneticist working in Tel Aviv, Israel, since 2016, only 23 cases of this disorder have been reported in medical literature.

Cases 

The following is a list of every case report of the disorder.
 Goodman et al. describes Tel-Hashomer camptodactyly syndrome for the first time in history in two siblings that came from non-consanguineous parents.
 Goodman et al. observes two additional cases of the disorder
 Gollop and Colleto et al. describe members from two consanguineous Brazilian families.
 Patton et al. shows that the muscle weakness in the disorder is caused by abnormal muscle histology
 Tylki-Szymanska reports two people with the disorder whose parents were first cousins
 Pagnan et al. describes two siblings from a Brazilian family
 Toriello et al. describes two Latin American siblings with the disorder, both of them showing mitral valve prolapse 
 Zareen and Rashmi describe two Indian sisters with the disorder who came from a non-consanguineous family, both of them presented hirsuitism, a feature not seen before in Tel Hashomer camptodactyly.

References 

Genetic diseases and disorders
Autosomal recessive disorders